NUKEM Technologies GmbH is a nuclear engineering and consulting company managing radioactive waste and spent fuel and decommissioning of nuclear facilities. The company is located in Alzenau, Germany. It was established in 2006 as a subsidiary of Nukem Energy.  On 14 December 2009, Nukem Technologies was sold to Russian Atomstroyexport for €23.5 million.

Nukem Technologies builds the interim used fuel storage facility and the solid waste facility for the closed Ignalina Nuclear Power Plant.  In 2007, the company was awarded a contract by South Africa's PBMR Pty for the construction of a pilot fuel plant for the pebble bed modular reactor project.  Other projects include construction of dry spent fuel storage facilities at the Kozloduy Nuclear Power Plant, complex for treatment and conditioning of solid and combustible liquid radwaste at the Leningrad Nuclear Power Plant, waste treatment centre at the Kursk Nuclear Power Plant, industrial complex for solid radwaste management at the Chernobyl Nuclear Power Plant, and dismantling of the reactor block of Brennilis Nuclear Power Plant.

References

German companies established in 2006
Nuclear technology companies of Germany
Nuclear waste companies
Rosatom
Waste companies established in 2006